SS Dwight W. Morrow was a Liberty ship built in the United States during World War II. She was named after Dwight W. Morrow, an American businessman, diplomat, and politician. Morrow was a partner in J.P. Morgan & Co.,  served as United States Ambassador to Mexico from 1927–1930, and was a US Senator from New Jersey from 1930–1931.

Construction
Dwight W. Morrow was laid down on 5 July 1943, under a Maritime Commission (MARCOM) contract, MC hull 1206, by the St. Johns River Shipbuilding Company, Jacksonville, Florida; she was sponsored by Elizabeth Cutter Morrow, the widow of the namesake, she was launched on 21 September 1943.

History
She was allocated to Sprague Steamship Co., on 5 October 1943. On 13 October 1945, she was laid up in the National Defense Reserve Fleet, Mobile, Alabama, with an estimated $37,500 in damage. She was laid up in the, National Defense Reserve Fleet, Wilmington, North Carolina, 28 August 1948. She was sold for scrapping, on 4 April 1968, to Union Minerals and Alloys. She was listed as removed from the fleet on 16 May 1968. A telegram dated 27 February 1970, declares that she wasn't removed until this date, and sold to Horton Industries, Inc. The telegram goes on to say that with the removal of Dwight W. Morrow, the last ship remaining at Wilmington, the service of the Atlantic Reserve Fleet, Wilmington was complete after twenty-three and a half years.

References

Bibliography

 
 
 
 

 

Liberty ships
Ships built in Jacksonville, Florida
1943 ships
Mobile Reserve Fleet
Wilmington Reserve Fleet